Anton Coenrad Pitout (born 20 November 1976) is a South African former rugby union footballer.

Life
There was much fanfare around Pitout's move to Munster, but his time with the province was not successful, with Pitout managing just 5 appearances during the 2005–06 season, before to join Japanese side Ricoh Black Rams.

References

External links
Munster Profile
ESPN Scrum Profile

Living people
1976 births
South African rugby union players
Munster Rugby players
Rugby union wings
Rugby union centres
South Africa international rugby sevens players
Commonwealth Games medallists in rugby sevens
Commonwealth Games bronze medallists for South Africa
Rugby sevens players at the 2002 Commonwealth Games
Medallists at the 2002 Commonwealth Games